Benedek Varju (born 21 May 2001) is a Hungarian professional footballer who plays for MTK Budapest FC.

Club statistics

Updated to games played as of 15 May 2021.

References

2001 births
Living people
People from Győr
Hungarian footballers
Hungary youth international footballers
Association football defenders
MTK Budapest FC players
Dorogi FC footballers
Nemzeti Bajnokság I players
Nemzeti Bajnokság II players